Shangyi is a town under the administration of Zijin County, Heyuan, Guangdong, China. , it administers one residential community and the following seven villages:
Shangyi Village
Guanghui Village
Jidong Village
Zhaoyuan Village
Yexi Village
Jiaotian Village
Juanpeng Village

References 

Township-level divisions of Guangdong
Zijin County